James Barry  (11 October 1741 – 22 February 1806) was an Irish painter, best remembered for his six-part series of paintings entitled The Progress of Human Culture in the Great Room of the Royal Society of Arts in London. Because of his determination to create art according to his own principles rather than those of his patrons, he is also noted for being one of the earliest romantic painters working in Britain, though as an artist few rated him highly until the fully comprehensive 1983 exhibition at the Tate Gallery led to a reassessment of this "notoriously belligerent personality", who emerged as one of the most important Irish artists. He was also notable as a profound influence on William Blake.

Life and work
James Barry was born in Water Lane (now Seminary Road) on the northside of Cork, Ireland on 11 October 1741. His father had been a builder, and, at one time of his life, a coasting trader between England and Ireland. Barry actually made several voyages as a boy, but convinced his father to let him study drawing and art. He first studied painting under local artist John Butts. At the schools in Cork to which he was sent he was regarded as a prodigy. About the age of seventeen he first attempted oil painting, and between that and the age of twenty-two, when he first went to Dublin, he produced several large pictures, which decorated his father's house, such as Aeneas escaping with his Family from the Flames of Troy, Susanna and the Elders and Daniel in the Lions' Den".

The painting that first brought him into public notice, and gained him the acquaintance and patronage of Edmund Burke, was founded on an old tradition of the landing of St Patrick on the sea-coast of Cashel, (this is a mistake reproduced from another source, Cashel is an inland town far from the sea) and of the conversion and Baptism of the King of Cashel  It was exhibited in London in 1762 or 1763 and rediscovered in the 1980s, in unexhibitable condition.

By the liberality of Burke and his other friends, Barry in the latter part of 1765 was enabled to go abroad. He went first to Paris, then to Rome, where he remained upwards of three years, from Rome to Florence and Bologna, and thence home through Venice. His letters to the Burkes, giving an account of Raphael, Michelangelo, Titian and Leonardo da Vinci, show remarkable insight. Barry painted two pictures while abroad, an Adam and Eve and a Philoctetes.

Soon after his return to England in 1771 he produced his picture of Venus, which was compared to the Galatea of Raphael, the Venus of Titian and the Venus de Medici. In 1773 he exhibited his Jupiter and Juno on Mount Ida. His Death of General Wolfe, in which the British and French soldiers are represented in very primitive costumes, was considered as a falling-off from his great style of art. His fondness for Greek costume was assigned by his admirers as the cause of his reluctance to paint portraits. His failure to go on with a portrait of Edmund Burke which he had begun caused a misunderstanding with his early patron. The difference between them is said to have been widened by Burke's growing intimacy with Sir Joshua Reynolds, and by Barry's jealousy of the fame and fortune of his rival “in a humbler walk of the art.” About the same time he painted a pair of classical subjects, Mercury inventing the lyre, and Narcissus, the last suggested to him by Burke. He also painted a historical picture of Chiron and Achilles, and another of the story of Stratonice, for which last the duke of Richmond gave him a hundred guineas.

In 1773 it was proposed to decorate the interior of St Paul's with historical and sacred subjects; but the plan fell to the ground, from not meeting with the agreement of the bishop of London and the Archbishop of Canterbury. Barry was upset by the failure, for he had in anticipation fixed the subject he intended to paint — the rejection of Christ by the Jews when Pilate proposes his release. In 1773 he published An Inquiry into the real and imaginary Obstructions to the Acquisition of the Arts in England, vindicating the capacity of the English for the fine arts and tracing their slow progress to the Reformation, to political and civil dissensions, and lastly to the general direction of the public mind to mechanics, manufactures and commerce.

In 1774 a proposal was made through Valentine Green to Sir Joshua Reynolds, Benjamin West, Cipriani, Barry, and other artists to ornament the Great Room of the Society for the encouragement of Arts, Manufactures and Commerce  (now the Royal Society of Arts), in London's Adelphi, with historical and allegorical paintings. This proposal was at the time rejected by the artists; but in 1777 Barry made an offer to paint the whole on condition that he was allowed the choice of his subjects, and that he would be paid by the society the costs of canvas, paints and models. His offer was accepted. He finished the series of pictures after seven years to the satisfaction of the members of the society, who granted him two exhibitions, and at subsequent periods voted him 50 guineas, a gold medal, and a further 200 guineas. Barry regularly returned to the series for more than a decade, making changes and inserting new features. The series of six paintings—The progress of human knowledge and culture—has been described by critic Andrew Graham-Dixon as "Britain's late, great answer to the Sistine Chapel".

Soon after his return from the continent Barry was chosen a member of the Royal Academy of Arts; and in 1782 he was appointed professor of painting in the room of Edward Penny with a salary of £30 a year. Among other things, he insisted on the necessity of purchasing a collection of pictures by the best masters as models for the students, and proposed several of those in the Orleans collection. This recommendation was not relished, and in 1799 Barry was expelled from the Academy soon after the appearance of his Letter to the Dilettanti Society, an eccentric publication, full of enthusiasm for his art and at the same time of contempt for the living professors of it. Barry remained the only academician ever to be expelled by the Academy until Brendan Neiland in July 2004.

During his time at the Royal Academy of Arts, Barry painted The Thames (or Triumph of Navigation) in 1791, which featured the English music historian Charles Burney.

After the loss of his salary, a subscription was set on foot by the Earl of Buchan to relieve him from his difficulties, and to settle him in a larger house to finish his picture of Pandora. The subscription amounted to £1000, with which an annuity was bought, but on 6 February 1806 he was seized with illness and died on the 22nd of the same month. On 4 March his remains were interred in St Paul's Cathedral, London.

The 1911 Encyclopædia Britannica has this to say:
As an artist, Barry was more distinguished for the strength of his conceptions, and for his resolute and persistent determination to apply himself only to great subjects, than for his skill in designing or for beauty in his colouring. His drawing is not especially good, his colouring ordinary. He was impulsive; sometimes morose, sometimes sociable and urbane; jealous of his contemporaries, and yet capable of pronouncing a splendid eulogy on Reynolds.

Barry also mastered the art of aquatint.

See also

British art
English school of painting
Irish art
List of people on stamps of Ireland

Notes

References

Pressly, William L. (1983).  James Barry: The Artist as Hero. London: The Tate Gallery.  (Catalogue of the 1983 exhibition)

External links
 
 
 The Correspondence of James Barry, new, annotated digital edition of all of Barry's known correspondence, edited by Tim McLoughlin.
 A National Treasure in New Brunswick:  James Barry's Death of General Wolfe
 The Collected works of James Barry is located at the Special Collections/Digital Library in Falvey Memorial Library at Villanova University.

A diary of sorts digitized by the Crawford Art Gallery. This book is currently stored at UCC.
 Profile on Royal Academy of Arts Collections

1741 births
1806 deaths
People from Cork (city)
Irish romantic painters
Royal Academicians
Irish male painters
Burials at St Paul's Cathedral